The Snowfield is a 2011 action and experimental narrative video game, developed as a student project by the Singapore-MIT Gambit Game Lab, and set in World War I. The game is set on the aftermath of a great battle, with the player controlling a weakened soldier in the middle of a storm.

According to the developers, the game's development was an attempt to make a simulation-based narrative game without the need for massive, complex AI and massive content generation. Instead, the developers created several segments of gameplay — characters, objects etc. — and fine-tuned them based on how initial testers interacted with them. As such, The Snowfield is:

Reception 
Adam Smith, writing for Rock, Paper, Shotgun, praised the game's narrative and design uniqueness, as well as its well-worked aesthetics. On Play This Thing, Greg Costikyan called it "a beautiful and horrifying game", praising its "stark, emotionally impactful setting". The game was a finalist at the 17th Annual Independent Games Festival, hosted in 2012, in the Student category.

References

External links 
 Web page
 Snowfield's Postmortem, by product owner Matthew Weise

Video games set in the 20th century
Anti-war video games
World War I video games
2011 video games
MacOS games
Video games developed in Singapore
Windows games